= Military Outdoor =

Military Outdoor Ltd.
- Type: Private
- Industry: E-commerce
- Founded: 13 May 2015
- Headquarters: Cambridge, England
- Owner: Miss Malgorzata Karolina Kadamus
- Website: www.military-outdoor.co.uk

Military Outdoor is a private limited company launched on 5 May 2013 and later incorporated on 13 May 2015 by Miss Malgorzata Karolina Kadamus. Military Outdoor is an E-Commerce platform based in Histon, Cambridge which specialises in the sale of military gear aimed at military contractors, security professionals and outdoor enthusiasts. Although owned by Miss Kadamus, the day-to-day operations of the website are managed by Director Justin Jones, a security consultant and (SIA) security industry authority.

Military Outdoor have been featured in a number of publications and media includes an interview with Justin Jones for ITV in January 2015 regarding security vests and body armour.
